Exoplanet is the debut studio album by American progressive metal band The Contortionist, released through Good Fight Entertainment on August 31, 2010. A remastered edition of the album was released on January 22, 2016.

A live music video for the song "Primal Directive" was released on July 1, 2022. The video was filmed during the band's Reimagined Tour from 2018. The video was released to coincide with the band's 2022 tour where Exoplanet and Language were performed in their entirety.

Concept 

Guitarist Robby Baca explained: 

The lyrics on the album focus on space, interstellar travel, and the journey to reach and colonize another habitable planet, hence the title of the album. Four tracks on the album are re-worked and renamed versions of material from their 2009 EP Apparition; the song "Eyes: Closed" was re-worked as "Flourish", "Infection" was re-worked as "Expire", "Realms" was re-worked as "Advent", and "Oscillator" was re-worked while keeping the original title. The lyrics of the re-worked songs were also re-written entirely in order to fit the overall concept of the album. The remaining 7 tracks, including the three title tracks, are all new material.

Track listing

Personnel 
The Contortionist
 Jonathan Carpenter – vocals, keyboards, lyrics
 Robby Baca – guitar, keyboards, programming
 Cameron Maynard – guitar, keyboards
 Joey Baca – drums
 Christopher Tilley – bass

Production
Produced, engineered & mixed by Ken Susi (Unearth)
Mastered by Alan Douches, @ West West Side Music, New York
Additional production & keyboards by Jordan King
Additional keyboards by Alex Ruger
Management by Ben Lionetti & Jason Rudolph
Design & layout by Sons of Nero

References 

2010 debut albums
The Contortionist albums
Albums with cover art by Sons of Nero